KTRF (1230 AM) is a radio station in Thief River Falls, Minnesota. The station is part of the Ingstad Minnesota Radio Network. KTRF reports local news, sports, weather, community information and obituaries. KTRF is part of Thief River Falls Radio, which also includes: KTRF-FM 94.1, KKAQ AM 1460, and KKDQ FM 99.3, Sjoberg's Cable Channel 3 and a weekday news letter publication - The Radio Gram.

KTRF covers local sports, Minnesota Twins baseball, and Minnesota Vikings football, Minnesota Timberwolves basketball, and Minnesota Wild hockey, as well as regional and high-school tournament play.

Local flavor is added with personality shows: The Good Morning Show with Bob Hultgren, Mid Mornings with Mark Allen, Team 1230 at noon, as well as the local news and local sports.

In the evening KTRF airs Fox Sports Radio, Coast to Coast AM, and other nationally syndicated programming.

External links
KTRF website

TRF
Radio stations in Minnesota
Sports radio stations in the United States
Radio stations established in 1947
1947 establishments in Minnesota
Thief River Falls, Minnesota